Edward Pears Stobart (born 18 April 1929), better known as Eddie Stobart, is a British businessman who started an agriculture business in the late 1940s.  This became Eddie Stobart Ltd in 1970 and expanded to a haulage company during the 1970s with the help of his late son Edward Stobart who gradually took over the running of the company. In 2004, the youngest son William Stobart and Andrew Tinkler (William Stobart's then brother in law) bought the company. Eventually the company demerged and became two separate public companies: the Stobart Group and Eddie Stobart Logistics.

Life and career
He was born to John and Adelaide Stobart in July 1929. Stobart married Nora Boyd on 26 December 1951 and they live in Cumbria. They had four children: Anne (born 1952), John (born 1953), Edward (1954–2011) and William (born 1961). Eddie bought his first lorry (a Guy Invincible four-wheeler truck) second-hand from the local garage in 1960, and had it re-painted in his choice of colours: post office red and Brunswick green. He took over the collection of basic slag (a waste product of steelworks used as fertiliser) when local company Harrison Ivinson went out of business, and purchased two Ford Thames Trader trucks which were also painted in his favourite colours with his logo on the doors.  A contract with ICI for storage of basic slag in 1963 enabled expansion of the business, and it became a limited company: Eddie Stobart Ltd in November 1970 with a share value of ten thousand pounds. In 1978 with a downturn in the Economy Eddie had 8 vehicles on the road along with a leased vehicle to Pickervance. Eddie continued to run the company until 1976, when son Edward took over running the transport side, but father Eddie continued to be involved, and retained his own separate warehouse until 1989, when he handed over full control to his sons Edward and William, retaining the title of non-executive chairman of Eddie Stobart Ltd until December 1992. The business grew into one of the largest privately owned transport and distribution companies in England, controlling around 2,500 trucks.

References

1929 births
Living people
People from Cumbria
20th-century English businesspeople
British businesspeople in shipping